Thomas Robert Talbert (August 4, 1924 Crystal Bay, Minnesota – July 2, 2005 Los Angeles) was an American jazz pianist, composer, and band leader.

Biography
He was born on August 4, 1924, in Crystal Bay, Minnesota, and grew up listening to big band music on the radio.

He got started as a band leader when he was drafted in the Army in 1943, becoming composer for a military band at Fort Ord, California, performing for War Bond drives throughout California.

In the late 1940s, he led his own big band on the West Coast, much of his work foreshadowing what became known as West Coast jazz before moving to New York in the early 1950s after being denied a recording contract in LA

In 1956, he recorded two records that would become his best known works, Wednesday's Child and Bix Duke Fats, gaining him fleeting fame.

When rock and roll eclipsed jazz in popularity, he moved to his parents' home in Minnesota in 1960, tried his hand at cattle ranching in Wisconsin, before eventually moving back to Los Angeles and a musical career in 1975.

In addition to composing for TV and movie studios, he became involved in music education, and set up a foundation to help talented young musicians, with one of the first recipients (in 1996) being Maria Schneider.

He died July 2, 2005.

Co-workers
Talbert has worked together with many other famous musicians. Some include:

Los Angeles in the 40s:
 Johnny Richards
 Lucky Thompson
 Dodo Marmarosa
 Hal McKusick
 Al Killian
 Art Pepper
 Steve White
 Claude Williamson

New York in the 50s:
 Marian McPartland
 Kai Winding
 Don Elliott
 Johnny Smith
 Oscar Pettiford
 Herb Geller
 Joe Wilder
 Eddie Bert
 Barry Galbraith
 Aaron Sachs
 Claude Thornhill

Selected discography
As sideman
 With the Boyd Raeburn Orchestra
 AFRS Downbeat, Los Angeles, early 1946, Memphis in June 
 Club Morocco, Hollywood, January 1946 
 AFRS Jubilee #169, Hollywood, California, early February 1946 
 Hollywood, February 5, 1946
 With Johnny Richards
 probably Los Angeles, 
Note:  no details except Tom Talbert, arranger
 With Patty McGovern, accompanied by the Tom Talbert Orchestra
 New York, August 1956, Wednesday's Child, Atlantic 

As leader
 Los Angeles, June 25, 1946
 Los Angeles, December 31, 1947
 Los Angeles, August 1949
 Los Angeles, November 1949
 New York, August 24, 1956, Bix, Duke, Fats, Atlantic  
 New York, September 7, 1956
 New York, September 14, 1956
 Hollywood, October 3, 4 & 5, 1977, Louisiana Suite
 Hollywood, August 11 & 12, 1987, Things As They Are, The Tom Talbert Septet 
 Rendezvous Ballroom, Newport Beach, California, 30 May 30, 1991 – 3 June 1991, Stan Kenton Celebration, Tom Talbert Jazz Orchestra 
 Hollywood, October 1991, Duke's Domain 
 Hollywood, October 10, 1991, The Warm Cafe 
 Hollywood, May 18, 1992
 Hollywood June 1992
 Hollywood, June 2, 1992
 Alhambra, California, May 18 & 19, 1993
 New York, July 1, 7 & 8, 1997, This Is Living! 
 Clinton Recording Studios, New York City, December 9, 10 & 11, 1999, To a lady: discover jazz with the Tom Talbert Orchestra

External links

References
General references

Inline citations

1924 births
2005 deaths
American jazz musicians
20th-century American musicians
United States Army personnel of World War II